Dariush Arjmand (born 27 July 1944 in Mashhad, Iran) is an Iranian actor.

A son of a military father and a housewife mother, he was born in Mashhad and grew up in Mashhad. He started performing in plays at the age of 12. At the age of 26, he started working for the Ministry of Art and Culture. In the meantime, is a Crystal-Simorgh winning Iranian actor.

Career

After many years of performing in theatre, he started his film acting career by appearing in Captain Khorshid (1986, Nasser Taghvaee), which was awarded the Crystal Simorgh for the best leading role at the Fajr International Film Festival.

Filmography
 Nakhoda Khorshid (1987 - a.k.a. Captain Khorshid)
 Kashtee-ye Angelica (1989 - a.k.a. The Angelica)
 Jostejoogar (1989)
 Pardehe Akhar (1991 - a.k.a. The Last Act)
 Nassereddin Shah, Actor-e Cinema (1992 - a.k.a. Once Upon a Time, Cinema)
 Zamin-e asemani (1994 - The Heavenly Earth)
 Adam barfi (1994 - a.k.a. The Snowman)
 Eteraz (2000 - a.k.a. Protest)
 Mosafer-e rey (2001 - Traveller of Rey)
 Sagkoshi (2001 - a.k.a. Killing Mad Dogs)
 Ezdevaj be sabke irani (2006 - Marriage in Iranian style)
 Raeis (The Boss 2008)
 The Maritime Silk Road (2010)
 Jorm (2011)
 Banuye Shahre Maa (2011)
 Without permission (2011)
 Harfe Mardom (2013)

See also
Cinema in Iran

References
3 Darush Arjmand on sarshenasan

External links

20th-century Iranian male actors
Iranian male film actors
Iranian male stage actors
People from Mashhad
1944 births
Living people
21st-century Iranian male actors
Recipients of the Order of Culture and Art
Crystal Simorgh for Best Actor winners
Crystal Simorgh for Best Supporting Actor winners